Chengannur (also spelled Chengannoor or Chenganur) is a  Municipality Town in the Alappuzha district of Kerala State, India. It is located in the extreme eastern part of the Alappuzha district, on the banks of Pamba River.
Chengannur is Known as The gateway of Sabarimala.
Chengannur is connected to Kollam and Kottayam by NH 183. Chengannur is noted for the Chengannur Mahadeva Temple (aka 'Dakshina Kailasam' as a major Shiva temple of South India) and its Old Syrian Church of the ancient Syrian Christian community. Chengannur is also a major destination of Sabarimala pilgrims known as the Gateway of Sabarimala.

The nearby municipal towns are Pandalam to the south, Mavelikkara to the west Pathanamthitta to the east and Tiruvalla to the north. The taluk comprises villages such as Kurattissery, Mannar, Ennakkad, Pandanad, Thiruvanvandoor, Chengannur, Mulakuzha, Ala, Puliyoor, Cheriyanad, Budhanoor and Venmony.

History

The name Chengannur (chen - kunnu- ur/noor) is derived from the words 'Che' (Malayalam) which means red,  'kunnu' (Malayalam) which means hill and 'ur/oor' (Malayalam) meaning land. It means the land of red hills. The red soil of Chengannur was different from the soil of nearby regions of Mavelikara & Kuttanad.

Chengannur was a part of the Ay Kingdom in the ancient period. The Ay Kingdom's territory extended from Pamba River in the north to Nagercoil in the south. Subsequently it came under the sovereignty of the Cheraman Perumals. The earliest epigraphical record to mention Chengannur (Thiruchenkunrur) is the Mampalli copper plate inscription (947 CE) which records a donation from Venad chiefly family to the Chengannur Temple.

In the medieval age, Chengannur was controlled by the Vanjipuzha chiefly family of Mundencavu. They were of Tulu Brahmin origin. The principality was a feudatory of Odanad. Chengannur came under the Kingdom of Travancore when the area was annexed by Marthanda Varma in 1742. The Vanjippuzha chief helped Marthanda Varma in his conquests. As a result, Marthanda Varma transferred the rights enjoyed over Chengannur by the defeated King of Odanad to the Vanjipuzha family. The economic, social and religious esteem and the political power and sway of Vanjipuzha family over Chengannur continued to be intact throughout even the British period uninterrupted.

In the historical period there were migrations from "Kollam" to "Chengannur" due to natural disasters. Pepper, popularly known as "black gold", was a major export item of Chengannur. Angadical (Angadi means market in Malayalam) was the main market in Chengannur. Current Chengannur market (Shastham Puram Chanda) was developed by Velu Thampi Dalawa. During the 19th and 20th centuries, this market played a major role in selling and buying goods produced in eastern region of the state with the coastal region of Kerala.

Mahatma Gandhi addressed at the Mills Ground (Mills Maithan is Ksrtc Bus stand now) at Chengannur in 1925 as part of his visit to the Kingdom of Travancore. In 1938 as part of Indian independence movement, large gathering of people from all over Central Travancore were present at the Mills Maithan in Chengannur in response to a notification circulated by the State Congress. There was police lathi charge during the meeting and a person named 'Kutilil George' died and scores of people were injured.

Chengannur Municipality was formed in the year 1980 with Shri. P.K John Plammoottil as its First Municipal Chairman.

Culture
The cultural background of Chengannur originates from the era of Royal rule. Chengannur was a part of Vanjippuzha Principality which was under the rule of Travancore.

Chengannur town is in the banks of holy river Pamba which influenced the culture of this town. There are many "Chundan Vallam" (Snake boats) participating in Aranmula Boat Race hails from Chengannur and nearby areas. Padayani is a traditional temple art-form that is performed as part of the festival in Vadasserikkavu Devi Temple, located 2 km north of Chengannur town. Chengannur has produced several great artists. The most famous one is the famous Kathakali artist Chenganoor Raman Pillai, popularly known as "Guru Chengannur".

Chengannur was famous for the craftsmen who were brought by rulers of Travancore to build the Sabarimala temple. Later generations of those craftsmen are also famous for their craftsmen skills. Idols of the deities of many temples in Kerala are crafted in Chengannur. Mannar in Chengannur Taluk is famous for the bronze industry.

Chengannur is a major Shaiva pilgrim destination in India. Chengannur temple is one of the 108 temples believed to be created by Parasurama. Vishnu temples which are believed to be created by the Pandavas of Mahabharatha are in and around Chengannur. These temples are major Vaishnava pilgrim destinations of South India. The Chengannur Mahadeva Temple is located in the heart of Chengannur town, very close from Pamba River flowing towards the east. The temple is built in Kerala style architecture, which is common in all temples in the South Indian state of Kerala.

Chengannur Suriyani Church is another example for the architecture excellence of this town. It was built by Vanjipuzha Chief. The Church is shared by Marthoma and Orthodox believers of the locality including cemetery and all other assets. It is famous for its unique architecture. There is a 33.5 feet tall Cross made from single stone is a major attraction of its Architectural beauty. Aval Nercha(Flattened rice offering) at this church is another significant tradition that is believed to have been initiated by a member of the church "Mrs.Akkama" nearly 400 years ago. This custom is still practiced by the local believers and organised by the members of Mukkath Kudumba Yogam on Maundy Thursday every year.

Demographics
As of 2011 Census, Chengannur had a population of 23,466 among which 10,933 are males and 12,533 are females. The average female sex ratio was 1146 higher than the state average of 1084. 7.2% of the population was under 6 years of age. Chengannur had an average literacy of 97.8% higher than the state average of 94%; male literacy was 98.3% and female literacy was 97.4%.

Transport
Chengannur is well-connected by road and rail. State Highway 1 (SH1), popularly known as the MC Road, passes through the heart of the town and connects Chengannur to state capital, Thiruvananthapuram and Angamaly in Eranakulam District. The Chengannur - Kottayam stretch of the MC Road is also part of the NH 220 which stretches between Kollam and Theni. Another major road is State Highway 10 which connects Chengannur to Mavelikkara and Kozhencherry. Besides these two roads, there are also many arterial roads running across the length and breadth of the town.

Road
Kerala State Road Transport Corporation has a depot at Chengannur (station code: CGNR); it is among the 29 major depots in the state. The KSRTC depot at Chengannur has an inter-state bus service, which is operated to Kanyakumari. KSRTC runs buses to different cities and towns inside and outside the state. Some of the Major destinations are Thiruvananthapuram, Ernakulam, Thrissur, Kozhikode, Mangalore, Mukambika, Kanyakumari, Coimbatore, Palani, Kannur and Wayanad.  The Municipal Private bus stand is located in front of the railway station. Private buses leave this stand heading to various places in the Alappuzha, Kottayam, Pathanamthitta and Kollam districts. In addition to these, private luxury buses are available to Major cities like, Bangalore, Chennai, Coimbatore, Mysore, Salem, Mangalore etc.

Rail

Chengannur Railway Station (station code: CNGR), is an important railway station between Kollam and Kottayam. It is a major railway station in the Thiruvananthapuram railway division of the Southern Railway Zone (India). People from eastern part of the state are using this railway station for travelling to various parts of the country. All the trains traveling through this route stop at Chengannur station. It caters to the needs 3 districts, viz. Alappuzha, Kollam and Pathanamthitta. By rail, Chengannur is well connected to major cities in India like Delhi, Mumbai, Chennai, Kolkata, Bangalore, Hyderabad, Pune, Agra, Ahmedabad, Bikaner, Mangalore, Bhopal, Guwahati, Nagpur, Jammu and other major cities of the country. Recently, the station has been declared as "The Gateway to Sabarimala". The rail line between Chengannur and Thiruvananthapuram has been doubled and electrified. Two new lines are proposed from Chengannur: one to Thiruvananthapuram via Adoor and the other to Sabarimala via Pathanamthitta. Furthermore, an MRTS is proposed to be established between Thiruvananthapuram and Chengannur. There is one more small railway station at Cheriyanadu which is 6 km from the town center.

Air
The nearest airport is Trivandrum International airport which is about 116 km from Chengannur. Another nearby airport is Cochin International Airport (CIAL) which is about and 127 km from Chengannur. With these two airports, Chengannur is well connected to Major Indian cities as well as the Countries in Middle East, Far East, Europe and Americas.

Climate
Köppen-Geiger climate classification system classifies its climate as tropical monsoon (Am).

Administration

The two administrative systems prevailing in the Chengannur are Revenue and local self-government. As per the revenue system, Chengannur is one of the two revenue divisions of Alappuzha district. The Chengannur revenue division comprises Karthikapally, Chengannur and Mavelikkara taluks consisting of a total of 44 villages. Under the local self-government system, Chengannur is divided into 1 statutory town and development blocks consisting of 11 panchayats.

Politics

Lok Sabha
Chengannur is a part of the Mavelikara constituency which after demarcation extends from Changanassery in Kottayam district to Kottarakkara in Kollam district. Kodikunnil Suresh of the INC has been representing the Mavelikkara constituency since 2009.

State Assembly
Chengannur's assembly constituency (Number 110) is a part of the Mavelikkara (Lok Sabha constituency). The first speaker of the Kerala legislative assembly, Sankaranarayanan Thampi, was an MLA from Chengannur. K. K. Ramachandran Nair was the MLA from 2016 onwards. He died and was replaced in the by-elections conducted on 28 May 2018 by Saji Cheriyan of Left Democratic Front.

Economy
There are many state Government offices, Banks and educational institutions located in Chengannur. A good number of people work in these institutions. Other major source of income is from the Non Residential Indians, which is a common economical factor in the central Travancore region, and the rest of Kerala as well. Agriculture is also there in the outskirts, but mostly confined to Rubber Plantations. There are no major industries in Chengannur, but a number of small scale industries are present. Major private employers are limited to banks, hospitals and shops.

Chengannur Central Hatchery in chengannur which was started in 1961 was Asia's biggest poultry hatchery under government initiative.

In Sabarimala season, which starts from mid-November to mid-January there is a huge boost in economical activities in this town. Since Chengannur is the nearest Railway station to Sabarimala Temple, most devotees use this railway station to visit the temple. During this season a boost in restaurant, hotel and transportation business is visible.

Notable people
 Viralminda Nayanar- 9th Century Nayanar Saint
 George Joseph - Indian Freedom Fighter and Editor of Young India, The Independent (India) magazines
 M. R. Kurup - ISRO Scientist and Founder of the First Solid Rocket Propellant Plant in India
 K. M. Cherian - Renowned Cardiac Surgeon who performed India's first coronary artery bypass surgery
 Chenganoor Raman Pillai - Kathakali Artist
 Puthencavu Mathan Tharakan - Malayalam Poet
 Sivaraman Cheriyanad - Malayalam writer and teacher
 Acharya Narendra Bhooshan - Indian linguist and Vedic Scholar
 Captain Thomas Philipose  -  Maha Vir Chakra Awardee
 Pothan Joseph - Renowned Journalist
 Puthenpurayil Mathew Joseph - Renowned Educationist and Founder Principal of Laxmibai National College of Physical Education
 Mela Raghu - Indian actor
 Sony Cheruvathur - Former Captain of Kerala cricket team
 Saji Cheriyan - Minister for Fisheries, Culture and Youth Affairs, Government of Kerala

Places of worship

The population of Chengannur mainly practices Hinduism and Christianity. Muslims are also found in the M.C. Road Mulakuzha region of the town. Most of Muslims are living at Kollakadavu and Mannar areas.

Chengannur Mahadeva Temple
Thripuliyoor Mahavishnu Temple
Thrichittatt Maha Vishnu Temple
Anandeswaram Sree Mahadeva Kshethram
Cheriyanad Sree Balasubrahmanya Swami Temple

IPC Faith Centre 
Pazhaya Suriyani Pally (Old Syrian Church)
St. Mary's Orthodox Cathedral, Puthencavu

Educational organizations

See also

References

Hindu pilgrimage sites in India
Cities and towns in Alappuzha district